Callands is an unincorporated community in Pittsylvania County, in the U.S. state of Virginia. It was named after Samuel Calland, a native of Scotland that immigrated during the 18th century, whose general store became a popular fixture of the community. The area around the store served as the county seat of Pittsylvania County until the end of 1776.

Before the American Revolutionary War, Callands was also the seat of the Antrim Parish, which later became the Camden Parish, of the Virginia colony's established church, the Church of England. The parish priest lived here, and traveled to other churches of the parish in rotation, including the Old Chapel Church in Penhook, Virginia.

"The larger building, on the other side of present-day VA 969, appears (by its exterior and interior design, and by local tradition) to be the courthouse, constructed during 1772 by Roberts after five years' procrastination, but incomplete records of Roberts' tumultuous business and public dealings make it difficult to identify the building for certain as the courthouse structure. By 1777 the court had been moved to present-day Chatham, and by 1788 the large brick building had come into the ownership of James Smith and Samuel Calland. By 1792 Calland was sole owner, and in subsequent years his store and post office in this building gave the community the name used to this day."

The Callands Festival (Autumn Potpourri Festival) is held there on the first Saturday of each October.

External links
 Virginia is for Lovers: Callands Festival

References

Unincorporated communities in Virginia
Unincorporated communities in Pittsylvania County, Virginia